Kinwun Mingyi U Kaung, Duke of Lekaing C.S.I. (also spelt U Gaung; 3 February 1822 – 30 June 1908) was a chief minister during the reigns of King Mindon and Thibaw, as well as a colonial civil servant. He attempted to westernise the Burmese kingdom's existing bureaucracy into a more democratic system. Because of such attempts to do so, he was accused by many as decoy to have allowed Britain to win the Third Anglo-Burmese War.

Background
Kinwon Mingyi was born Maung Chin on 3 February 1822 (Sunday, 12th waxing of Tabodwe 1183 ME) in Madaingbin village (in the Lower Chindwin district). His father U Hmo was a foot soldier in the Natshinywe Infantry Regiment. As was customary tradition, he was destined to follow the footsteps of his father. However, he escaped conscription by ordaining as a Buddhist monk and was given the Dharma name Āloka. He moved to Amarapura and lived at Bagaya Monastery, the monastery of the Bagaya Sayadaw, then the Supreme Patriarch of the Konbaung dynasty. He was also schooled at a college led by U Yanwe, who eventually became the chief minister of King Mindon with the title . He disrobed and returned to the laity at the age of 25.

Joining service
After the Second Anglo-Burmese War in 1853, he joined the court service of King Mindon (who had deposed his half brother, King Pagan), who renamed him  (lit. "good", considered more favorable than his birth name Chin) and appointed him the Clerk of the Royal Treasury and received Ywathitgyi village as his appanage. In 1857, he was promoted to high clerk of Hluttaw (လွှတ်တော် စာရေးကြီးအရာ). In 1871, he was appointed minister of third rank at the Hluttaw, the national governing body and was responsible for the country's police and customs stations, where he earned his moniker  (lit. 'minister of the patrol stations'). 

In 1871, he led the first Burmese diplomatic group to Europe and successfully asserted Burmese sovereignty. There, he was received by Queen Victoria and invested Prince of Wales (later to be King Edward VII) and William Ewart Gladstone gold  of 21 and 18 strings respectively. he and his embassy, consisting of Shwe O (later the Kyaukmyaung Atwinwun) and Shwe Bin and Maung Mye (later the Debayin Wundauk). By 1872, he had risen to the rank of regional governor of Minhla District. In 1874, he was appointed as the minister of gun. From then on, he had to take on more responsibility in national defense and military affairs. The position of gun minister has the power to oversee the army and land forces. Then, in 1875, he was appointed as the Duke of Lekaing. 

Before King Mindon's death in 1878, U Kaung was made Commander-in-Chief. After King Mindon's death, Kinwun Mingyi lost much of his influence. He ordered the Burmese troops during the Third Anglo-Burmese War to not attack invading British. U Kaung had traveled around the world and seen for himself the power of the British military. When U Kaung pleaded to the King Thibaw at the Royal court that we should not appropriate to go to war with the British, Supayalat angrily says, 
 
U Kaung's role in the initial collapse of Burmese resistance later gave rise to the popular mnemonic  ("U Kaung's treachery, end of dynasty"), corresponding to Burmese Era 1247 or 1885 AD in Burmese numerology.

British rule
Under British colonial rule, Kinwon Mingyi served as a civil servant in the British administration. In 1887, he was awarded the Companionship of the Order of the Star of India (CSI) and in 1897, he became one of the first two indigenous Burmese to be appointed to the Legislative Council of Burma.

During his civil service, he penned many famous books and poems in Burmese literature. His personal library was acquired by the Bernard Free Library in Rangoon.

U Kaung was twice married. His first marriage was to the Princess of Singyan, one of the lesser queens of Pagan Min. He did not have any biological children, but he adopted two sons of his brother-in-law (of his second wife).

He died of paralysis at his residence in Fort Dufferin in Mandalay on 30 June 1908.

References

Bibliography
 
 
 Burmese Encyclopedia Vol 2, p-406  printed in 1955

1822 births
1908 deaths
People of the Third Anglo-Burmese War
Government ministers of Myanmar
Companions of the Order of the Star of India
Konbaung dynasty
Members of the Legislative Council of Burma
Burmese male poets
19th-century Burmese poets
19th-century male writers